Selina Zumbühl (born 13 October 1983) is a Swiss football midfielder, currently playing for FC Zürich in Switzerland's Nationalliga A.

She is a member of the Swiss national team.

References

1983 births
Living people
Swiss women's footballers
Switzerland women's international footballers
FC Zürich Frauen players
Swiss Women's Super League players
Grasshopper Club Zürich (women) players
Sportspeople from Nidwalden
Women's association football midfielders